If I Can Love You So is a 2019 Chinese romance television series starring Liu Shishi, Tong Dawei and Bao Jianfeng, based on Qianxun Qianxun's novel of the same name. The TV series will be broadcast on Hunan Satellite TV from April 9, 2019 at 20 p.m. The TV series follows the story of a woman in a love triangle with two men.

Synopsis
Bai Kao'er, a television host found out her husband Qi Shujie had died in a car accident. Her deceased husband was discovered with another woman named Ye Sha. Ye Sha's husband was a renowned pianist Geng Mochi. Bai Kao'er and Geng Mochi met at their respective partner's funeral and blamed each other for their husband and wife's affair. Yet, the hate for each other soon turns to love and they forgive each other. Matters become complicated when Qi Shujie's brother Qi Shuli decides to interfere with their relationship.

Cast

Main
 Liu Shishi as Bai Kao'er, a radio anchorwoman.
 Tong Dawei as Geng Mochi, a pianist.
 Bao Jianfeng as Qi Shuli, a business elite.

Supporting
 Yang Yitong as Mi Lan
 Qi Huan as Ying Zhi
 Guo Xiaoxiao as Wei Minglun
 Zhu Tie as Zhang Qianshan
 Lai Jin as Jin Yi
 Sun Zhihong as Luo Hao
 Tao Hai as Huang Zhong, a lawyer.
 Yang Kaihan as Doctor Cai.
 Pu Chaoying as Mi Lan's mother.
 Ru Ping as Bai Kao'er's mother.
 Xie Yuan as Bai Kao'er's father.

Production
In order to achieve the best results, Qianxun Qianxun revised the script several times and studied in Beijing Film Academy for six months.

In 2015, Liu Shishi (Chinese Paladin 3 and Scarlet Heart) announced that she would be starring as Bai Kao'er, the female lead. actors Tong Dawei (Jade Goddess of Mercy and Struggle) and Bao Jianfeng (Lady Wu: The First Empress and The Prince of Qin, Li Shimin) were cast in lead roles for the drama.

The Clothing modeling team of Tiny Times were hired as the costume designer.

Shooting began on October 8, 2015 in a little town of Xiangxi Tujia and Miao Autonomous Prefecture, Hunan and ended on January 30, 2016. Filming locations included Beijing, Hunan, Seattle, and Vancouver.

Ratings 

 Highest ratings are marked in red, lowest ratings are marked in blue

Awards and nominations

References

External links
 
 

2019 Chinese television series debuts
2019 Chinese television series endings
Television shows based on Chinese novels
Chinese romance television series
Hunan Television dramas